Tsai Sheng-pang (born 23 October 1946) is a Taiwanese politician. He was a member of the Legislative Yuan from 1981 to 1996, then took office from 1996 to 1999 as an alternate legislator. He was also a member of the third National Assembly.

Tsai studied law at National Taiwan University. For much of his political career, Tsai was an independent. He joined the Kuomintang to represent the party in the 1993 Taipei County magisterial election, and lost to You Ching.

References

1946 births
Living people
New Taipei Members of the Legislative Yuan
Party List Members of the Legislative Yuan
Members of the 1st Legislative Yuan
Members of the 2nd Legislative Yuan
Members of the 3rd Legislative Yuan
Kuomintang Members of the Legislative Yuan in Taiwan
Fu Jen Catholic University alumni